Maddie Hay (born 11 April 1995) is an Australian netball player in the Suncorp Super Netball league, playing for Giants Netball. 
 

Hay grew up playing netball and representing New South Wales and Australia at various underage levels. She was a training partner at Giants Netball in 2018/19, though earned her debut in Round 1 of the 2019 season, briefly coming onto the court to replace an injured player. That was her only appearance for the Giants at Super Netball level that season, and she played most of the season for Canberra Giants in the Australian Netball League. Hay was signed by the Giants as a senior player for the 2020 season.

References

External links
 Netball New South Wales profile
 Netball Draft Central profile
 Super Netball profile

1995 births
Australian netball players
Giants Netball players
Living people
Netball New South Wales Waratahs players
Netball New South Wales Blues players
Australian Netball League players
Netball players from New South Wales
New South Wales Swifts players
ANZ Championship players
Suncorp Super Netball players
Canberra Giants (ANL) players
New South Wales state netball league players